Scott James Brown,  (born 16 May 1968), is a Church of Scotland minister and former Royal Navy chaplain. From 2010 to 2014, he served as Chaplain of the Fleet and was therefore the senior military chaplain in the Royal Navy.

Early life
Scott was born in Bellshill, Lanarkshire, Scotland, on 16 May 1968, the son of Margaret and Jim Brown of Hamilton. Educated at Hamilton Grammar School and Bell College of Technology. He graduated from the University of Aberdeen with a Bachelor of Divinity (BD) degree in 1992. While studying at university, he was also a member of the Aberdeen URNU.

Career
Following graduation, Brown underwent an assistantship at St Andrew's West, Falkirk, from 1992 to 1993. He was ordained by the Church of Scotland in 1993 by the Presbytery of Hamilton.

Military career
He then served with the Command Training Group, and was Staff Chaplain to the Chaplain of the Fleet. From 1999 to 2000, he served as Chaplain to the Very Reverend Dr John Cairns during his term as Moderator of the General Assembly of the Church of Scotland.

He was promoted Principal Chaplain in 2007. He was appointed at the same time to be an Honorary Chaplain to the Queen (QHC). On 1 November 2010, he was appointed Chaplain of the Fleet, and accorded the equivalent rank of a Rear Admiral. He retired in January 2015.

Later life
Having retired from the Naval service in 2014, Brown lives near Port of Menteith, Stirling. He is currently the Minister of Buchlyvie with Gartmore in the Presbytery of Stirling.

Personal life
Brown married Colin Fleming in 2006.

Honours and decorations
Brown was appointed Commander of the Order of the British Empire (CBE) in the 2014 New Year Honours. He is a recipient of the Queen Elizabeth II Golden Jubilee Medal and the Queen Elizabeth II Diamond Jubilee Medal.

References

Chaplains of the Fleet
Living people
Honorary Chaplains to the Queen
1968 births
20th-century Ministers of the Church of Scotland
Alumni of the University of Aberdeen
People from Bellshill
Commanders of the Order of the British Empire
LGBT Calvinist and Reformed ministers
21st-century Ministers of the Church of Scotland